Clapboard may refer to:

Clapboard (architecture), a building material
Clapperboard, a film production tool
Clapboard Creek, a stream in New Jersey in the United States